Claude Arnaud (born 24 April 1955 in Paris) is a French writer, essayist, biographer. He won the 2006 Prix Femina Essai.

Biography
He worked as an offset printing activist, and participated with the Workers' Struggle.

From 1977–83 he worked in "Film" monthly, led by Jacques Fieschi. He studied literature at the University of Vincennes.
He wrote a play about "the redemptive powers of love," with Bernard Minoret, "Les salons" ("Trade shows"). In 1988, he published a biography of Nicolas Chamfort.

Villa Medicis
He was Resident at the Villa Medici in Rome in 1989 and 1990.

Works
Bernard Minoret, Claude Arnaud, Les salons, J.C. Lattès, 1985

Le caméléon: roman, B. Grasset, 1994, 
Le jeu des quatre coins: roman, B. Grasset, 1998, 
Jean Cocteau, Gallimard, 2003, 
Qui dit je en nous: une histoire subjective de l'identité, Grasset, 2006, 
Babel 1990: Rome, Saint-Pétersbourg, New York, Gallimard, 2008, 
Qu'as-tu fait de tes frères?, Grasset & Fasquelle, 2010, 
John Richardson, Elizabeth Cowling, Claude Arnaud, Picasso: the Mediterranean years 1945–1962, Rizzoli, 2010, 
Les chemins creux, Editions Graine d'Auteur, 2011,

References

External links
Author's website

1955 births
Living people
Writers from Paris
20th-century French male writers
20th-century French novelists
21st-century French novelists
Prix Femina essai winners
Prix Fénéon winners
21st-century French male writers